Even Hovland (born 14 February 1989) is a Norwegian professional footballer who plays as a centre back for Allsvenskan club BK Häcken and the Norway national team.

Club career
In his youth, Hovland played for the local clubs Vadheim IL and IL Høyang, before joining Sogndal in 2007.

During the warm-up to the opening match of the 2009 season against Hønefoss, Hovland broke his foot, and missed almost the entire season.

In 2009–2010, Hovland was on trial at Manchester United, but was not offered a contract.

Hovland joined Molde FK ahead of the 2012-season.

In the 2012–13 UEFA Champions League qualifying match against FC Basel, Hovland was injured and had to leave the pitch after 25 minutes. The knee-injury kept him out of play for the rest of the 2012-season.

On 14 June 2014, Molde announced that Hovland had signed a three-year deal with German club 1. FC Nürnberg.

On 11 September 2017, Sogndal announced that Hovland had returned to the club after having been released from Nürnberg. He had signed a deal keeping him at Sogndal until 2020.

On 4 April 2018, Rosenborg announced that Hovland had signed a three and a half years with the club.

On 28 December 2021, Hovland signe a two-year contract with Häcken. He established himself as a consistent performer, and by the end of the season, he had played for BK Häcken 33 times in all competitions, scoring six goals, helping them to their first ever Allsvenskan title. He was voted Allsvenskan Defender of the Season at the end of the season.

International career
Hovland was named in Norway's squad for the EURO 2012 qualification match against Cyprus on 11 October 2011, because Brede Hangeland was suspended due to yellow cards. Hovland made his debut for the senior team in a 1–1 friendly draw against Denmark on 15 January 2012. The day before Norway's friendly against Northern Ireland on 29 February 2012, Hovland was again called up for Norway as a replacement for Brede Hangeland, but because Hovland had played a pre-season match with Molde in Spain the same day he withdrew from the national team squad.

Personal life
Hovland's sister Stine is also an international footballer. The siblings were teammates in their local youth team.

Hovland's cousin Viktor is an international professional golfer.

Career statistics

Honours
Molde
Tippeligaen: 2012, 2014
Norwegian Cup: 2013, 2014

Rosenborg
Eliteserien: 2018
Norwegian Cup: 2018

BK Häcken
 Allsvenskan: 2022

Individual
 Tippeligaen Defender of the Year: 2011
 Allsvenskan Defender of the Year: 2022

References

External links
Profile at Sogndal Fotball

Living people
1989 births
People from Høyanger
Norwegian footballers
Association football central defenders
Norway international footballers
Norwegian First Division players
Eliteserien players
2. Bundesliga players
Sogndal Fotball players
Molde FK players
1. FC Nürnberg players
Rosenborg BK players
BK Häcken players
Norwegian expatriate footballers
Expatriate footballers in Germany
Norwegian expatriate sportspeople in Germany
Expatriate footballers in Sweden
Norwegian expatriate sportspeople in Sweden
Sportspeople from Vestland